Albert Evan Adermann AO (10 March 1927 – 3 November 2001) was an Australian  politician. He was a member of the National (Country) Party and succeeded his father Sir Charles Adermann in federal parliament. He held ministerial office in the Fraser Government as Minister for the Northern Territory (1975–1978) and Minister for Veterans' Affairs (1978–1980).

Early life
Adermann was born in Kingaroy, Queensland, son of Charles Adermann, and was educated at Brisbane Boys' College.  He did not complete a medical degree at the University of Queensland and instead became a dairy farmer in Kingaroy.  He then completed a Bachelor of Commerce by external study at University of Queensland and worked as a public accountant.  He married Joan Hovard in 1951 and they had three sons and two daughters. He was a councillor of Kingaroy Shire from 1958 to 1967.

Political career
Adermann was elected as the member for Fisher following the retirement of his father at the 1972 election and represented the Country Party (National Country Party from 1975).  He was appointed Minister for the Northern Territory following the Fraser Government's win at the 1975 election and held it until its abolition in September 1978.  He put in place the arrangements for Northern Territory self-government and was responsible for the establishment of Uluru National Park and continuing the reconstruction of Darwin after Cyclone Tracy. In July 1978, he was appointed Minister for Veterans' Affairs and held it until November 1980.  He was responsible for establishing an inquiry into the effects of Agent Orange on Australian servicemen who had fought in the Malayan Emergency and the Vietnam War.  Following a redistribution which transferred his home to the new Division of Fairfax, Adermann ran for this seat and won it at the 1984 election.  He continued to represent Fairfax until his retirement from parliament at the 1990 election.

Later life
Adermann became president of the Queensland Church of Christ and was made an Officer of the Order of Australia in 1990 for "services to the Australian parliament, to the community, particularly through the Churches of Christ in Queensland, and to local government".  He died in 2001 and was survived by his wife, three sons and two daughters.

Notes

National Party of Australia members of the Parliament of Australia
Members of the Australian House of Representatives for Fisher
Members of the Australian House of Representatives for Fairfax
Members of the Australian House of Representatives
Officers of the Order of Australia
1927 births
2001 deaths
Australian members of the Churches of Christ
People from Kingaroy
20th-century Australian politicians
Government ministers of Australia
Australian people of German descent